Presidential elections were held in Gabon on 5 December 1993, the first time more than one candidate had contested a presidential election in the country. Incumbent President Omar Bongo, in power since 1967, sought a five-year term against twelve other candidates. According to official results Bongo won in the first round with 51.2% of the vote. However, the main opposition leader, Paul Mba Abessole, alleged fraud, claimed victory, and threatened to form a rival government. Riots in 1994 practically brought the country to a standstill until Bongo agreed to attend a peace conference with opposition groups in September 1994, in which a coalition government was formed until the 1996 parliamentary election, which Bongo's Gabonese Democratic Party won by a landslide.

Campaign
Bongo was supported by the "New Alliance", a coalition that included the Association for Socialism in Gabon, the Circle of Liberal Reformers, the Gabonese Socialist Union and the People's Unity Party.

Results
Based on exit polling at the time of the election, the news organization Reuters placed Bongo's share of the vote at about 37%. Voter turnout was 88.1%.

References

Presidential elections in Gabon
Gabon
election
Gabon